Pierre Bouteyre (born 7 September 1971) is a tennis coach and former professional player from France.

Bouteyre qualified for two Grand Slam tournaments during his career. His first appearance was in the 1993 French Open, where he was defeated by Bart Wuyts in the opening round. He fared better at the 1996 Wimbledon Championships, winning a 230-minute-long five-set marathon over world number 23 Carlos Moyá, 10–8 in the final set. The Frenchman was eliminated in the second round, by seventh-seed Goran Ivanišević.

In 2022, Bouteyre was formally accused of rape and sexual assault by former protégée Fiona Ferro.

References

External links
 

1971 births
Living people
French male tennis players
Sportspeople from Nîmes